Two-time defending champion Malcolm Whitman defeated William Larned in the challenge round, 6–4, 1–6, 6–2, 6–2 to win the men's singles tennis title at the 1900 U.S. National Championships. The event was held at the Newport Casino in Newport, R.I., USA.

Larned had defeated George Wrenn in the All Comers' Final.

Draw

Challenge round

Final eight

Earlier rounds

Section 1

Section 2

Section 3

Section 4

References

External links
 1900 U.S. National Championships on ITFtennis.com, the source for this draw

Men's singles
1900